Kenji Uematsu (born 28 October 1976 in Portugalete, Vizcaya) is a Spanish judoka. His father is Japanese and his mother is Spanish. His younger brother, Kiyoshi, is also a professional judoka.

Achievements

References

 

1976 births
Living people
Spanish male judoka
Judoka at the 2004 Summer Olympics
Olympic judoka of Spain
Spanish people of Japanese descent